"Don't Be Shy" is a song by Australian R&B band Kulcha. It was released in July 1994 as the second single from the band's debut studio album, Kulcha. The song peaked at number 13 in Australia and 8 in New Zealand.

Track listing
 "Don't Be Shy" (radio edit) - 3:52
 "Don't Be Shy" (album edit) - 4:09
 "Don't Be Shy" (Gangsta mix) - 4:10
 "Shaka Jam" (radio edit) - 4:08

Charts

Weekly charts

Year-end charts

References

1994 songs
1994 singles
Kulcha (band) songs